Klaff is a surname. Notable people with the surname include:

 Jack Klaff (born 1951), South African actor, writer, and academic
 Wanda Klaff (1922–1946), Nazi concentration camp overseer executed for war crimes